The Rairden Bridge is a Pennsylvania through truss near Manderson, Wyoming, which crosses the Big Horn River. The bridge was built in 1916 by the Monarch Engineering Company. The bridge cost $30,986, making it one of the most expensive bridges commissioned by a Wyoming county government. In addition, it is one of two Pennsylvania through truss bridges remaining in Wyoming. The bridge was replaced by a new structure and abandoned in 1979.

The bridge was added to the National Register of Historic Places on February 22, 1985. It was one of several bridges added to the NRHP for its role in the history of bridge construction in Wyoming.

References

External links

Road bridges on the National Register of Historic Places in Wyoming
Bridges completed in 1916
Buildings and structures in Big Horn County, Wyoming
National Register of Historic Places in Big Horn County, Wyoming
Pennsylvania truss bridges in the United States